Vurpăr is a commune in Sibiu County, Transylvania, central Romania. It is composed of a single village, Vurpăr. 

In 2002, it had 2,359 inhabitants, of whom 1,298 were Romanians, 1010 Romani, 50 Germans (namely Transylvanian Saxons, and 1 other. Of those, 2,154 were Romanian Orthodox, 29 were Lutheran, and most of the rest belonged to newer Protestant faiths.

Germans were long dominant in Burgberg, which was founded in the 13th century. Most of the commune's residents, who are governed by a mayor and a council, work in agriculture.

The Vurpăr railway station was the terminus of the Vurpăr branch line of the Agnita railway line. It still exists, along with the track, which has been protected.

References 

Communes in Sibiu County
Localities in Transylvania
Romani communities in Romania